De Witt (also: De Wit, De Witte and De With) is the name of an old Dutch patrician and regenten family. Originally from Dordrecht, the genealogy of the family begins with Jan de Witte, a patrician who lived around 1295.  The family have played an important role during the Dutch Golden Age. They were at the centre of Dordrecht and Holland oligarchy from the end of the 16th century until 1672, and belonged to the Dutch States Party.

The De Witt family during the Dutch Golden Age 
During the Dutch Golden Age, the republican de Witt family opposed the royalists associated with the House of Orange-Nassau. With other republican political leaders at Dordrecht, such as the van Slingelandts, and at Amsterdam with the Bicker and de Graeff families, the de Witts worked to abolish stadtholdership. They sought full sovereignty for individual regions, so that the Republic of the United Seven Netherlands would not yield to authoritarianism. Instead of a sovereigns (or stadtholder), political and military power would be entrusted to the States General and Holland's city regents.

From 1650 into the 1670s, the de Witts played leading roles in Dutch government. Republicans called this era the Ware Vrijheid (True Freedom), the First Stadtholderless Period.

The de Witt family lost its leadership role in Rampjaar 1672, when Orangists resumed leadership and murdered brothers Johan and Cornelis de Witt.

Family members (selection) 
 Jacob Fransz de Witt (1548–1621), mayor of Dordrecht, member of the States of Holland
 Cornelis Fransz de Witt (1545–1622), mayor and regent of Dordrecht, member of the States of Holland and West Friesland
 Andries de Witt (1573–1637), Grand Pensionary of Holland
 Johan de Witt (1618–1676), Burgemeester and regent of Dordrecht
 Jacob de Witt (1589–1674), mayor  and regent of Dordrecht, member of the States of Holland
 Cornelis de Witt (1623–1672), mayor  and regent of Dordrecht, ruwaard or governor of the land of Putten, deputy of the States to the Dutch Navy during the Second Anglo-Dutch War
 Johan de Witt (1625–1672), heer van Zuid- en Noord-Linschoten, Snelrewaard and IJsselveere, Grand Pensionary of Holland
 Johan de Witt Jr. (1662–1701), heer van Zuid- en Noord-Linschoten, Snelrewaard and IJsselveere, secretary of the city of Dordrecht
 Cornelis Johansz de Witt (1696–1769), vrijheer van Jaarsveld, Burgemeester of Dordrecht, member of the States of Holland

 The early 19th Century American politician DeWitt Clinton was descended from the Dutch De Witt family, via his mother Mary De Witt (1737–1795)

Notes

Literature 
 Sypesteyn, C.A. van, De geslachten De Witt te Dordrecht en te Amsterdam in: De Nederlandsche heraut. Tijdschrift op het gebied van geslacht-, wapen- en zegelkunde jrg. 3 (1886 's-Gravenhage; C. van Doorn & zoon).
 Panhusen, Luc (2005) De Ware Vrijheid, De levens van Johan en Cornelis de Witt, Atlas
 Rowen, Herbert H. (1986) John de Witt – Statesman of the True Freedom“ Cambridge University Press. .
 Fölting, H.P., De landsadvocaten en raadpensionarissen der Staten van Holland en West-Friesland 1480–1795. Een genealogische benadering. Deel III in: Jaarboek Centraal Bureau Voor Genealogie. Deel 29 (1975 Den Haag; Centraal Bureau Voor Genealogie).
 Israel, Jonathan I. (1995) The Dutch Republic – Its Rise, Greatness, and Fall – 1477–1806 Clarendon Press, Oxford, .

About homonym family  
 The noble family "de Witte" (from Antwerpen)

Dutch families
Dutch patrician families